Without Feathers is the second album by Montreal indie rock band the Stills. It was released May 9, 2006 by Vice Records. The album was produced by Gus Van Go.

Emily Haines from fellow indie band Metric appeared on "Baby Blues," while Jason Collett of Broken Social Scene and Sam Roberts were featured on the track "Oh Shoplifter".

The album debuted at No. 6 on the Top Heatseekers chart, but failed to hit the Billboard 200. In Canada, the album did not fare well on the charts. It premiered at No. 51 before moving out of the Top 100 the following week. The album was later released in the UK in 2007 by Drowned in Sound Recordings, including two new tracks.

Without Feathers featured a major personnel change; with the departure of original lead guitarist Greg Paquet, drummer Dave Hamelin moved to guitar and sang lead vocals on the majority of the album's tracks. It was also the first Stills album to feature keyboardist Liam O'Neil as a full-time member, and was the debut for drummer Julien Blais.

The album also marked a big change in sound, from the 1980s-influenced post-punk revivalism of their debut to a happier, more rootsy Americana-oriented approach, which Pitchfork termed "cheerful and heartfelt".

Track listing

US/Canada edition

UK edition

Personnel

The Stills
Olivier Corbeil – bass guitar, cowbell
Tim Fletcher – vocals, electric guitar, acoustic guitar
Dave Hamelin – vocals, electric guitar, acoustic guitar, drums, percussion, additional recording, mixing
Liam O'Neil – piano, organs, keyboards, saxophone, tambourine, vocals, additional recording

Additional musicians
Melissa Auf der Maur – handclaps on "Oh Shoplifter"
Colin Brooks – drums
"Chip" – trumpet on "Destroyer" and "It Takes Time"
Evan Cranley – trombone on "Destroyer" and "It Takes Time"
Kevin Drew – vocals on "She's Walking Out"
Eric Fares – acoustic guitar on "Oh Shoplifter"
Emily Haines – vocals on "Baby Blues"
Mikey Heppner – handclaps on "Oh Shoplifter"
Neil Johnson – saxophone on "Destroyer" and "It Takes Time"
Alfie Jurvanen – lead guitar on "In the Beginning" and "She's Walking Out"
Meghynn Norman – handclaps on "Oh Shoplifter"
Vincenzo Nudo – percussion on "Oh Shoplifter"
Elizabeth Powell – vocals on "Monsoon"
Sam Roberts – acoustic guitar on "Oh Shoplifter"
Felix Trenton – guitar on "Oh Shoplifter"

Production
Adam "Bix" Berger – management, vocals on "In the Beginning" and "Destroyer", handclaps on "Oh Shoplifter"
Werner F. – mixing
Ryan Morey – mastering
Cristophe Rihet – photography
Mathieu Roberge – assistant engineer, handclaps on "Oh Shoplifter"
Rod Shearer – recording
Gus van Go – production, recording, mixing, backing vocals, percussion on "Destroyer", cowbell on "Helicopters", guitar on "The House We Live In", tambourine on "She's Walking Out", handclaps on "Oh Shoplifter"
Patrick Watson – additional recording

References

2006 albums
The Stills albums
Vice Records albums
Albums produced by Gus van Go